Kikagati Hydroelectric Power Station, also referred to as Kikagati Power Station, is a  hydroelectric power station, in Uganda.

Location
The power station is located across the Kagera River, along Uganda's International border with the Republic of Tanzania. The geographical coordinates of the power station are 01°03'27.0"S, 30°39'33.0"E (Latitude:-1.057500; Longitude:30.659167).

Overview
The project will involve the construction of a dam, creating a  reservoir lake. The new reservoir will lie partly or wholly, within Tanzania. The new power station will be built at the location of another smaller power station that was destroyed in 1979 during the war that removed Idi Amin from power in Uganda.

In September 2011, the planned capacity installation was increased to 16.5 MW. This power project received partial funding from the Uganda GetFit Program.

Development rights
Initially, the Chinese company China Shan Sheng, was issued the construction license for the project in 2008. At that time, construction costs were estimated at US$25 million. The 33kV transmission line that will connect the power from the station to the Uganda national electricity grid has already been constructed. Some of the power will be sold to Tanzania, under arrangements made through the East African Community.

Between 2008 and 2013, the Chinese pulled out of the deal. Development rights were taken up by TrønderEnergi, a Norwegian power company, with a Ugandan subsidiary Tronder Energy Limited. In July 2013, TronderEnergi advertised for suitable firms to bid on the construction of Kikagati Power Station.

Construction timetable
Kikagati Power Station was awarded a production license by the Electricity Regulatory Authority (ERA), in October 2014. SBI International AG was awarded the construction contract. The construction cost was reported at US$50 million, in 2018. Construction started in February 2018, with commissioning planned for the first half of 2021. In March 2019, the project received a total of US$27 million in funding from the Emerging Africa Infrastructure Fund (EAIF) and the Private Infrastructure Development Group (PIDG). An equal amount of funding (50 percent) was provided by FMO (Netherlands). The project also benefitted from the KfW-funded GET-FiT program.
In August 2019, Afrik21 reported that the project had reached financial close at that time.

In January 2022, Voith Hydro completed the installation of three turbines, each rated at 5.19 MW, for total generation capacity of 15.57 MW, to be sold directly to the Uganda Electricity Transmission Company Limited (UETCL), via a 33kV evacuation line. UETCL, will in turn, sell half of the power station's energy to Tanzania Electric Supply Company Limited (TANESCO). The total construction cost was reported as US$87 million. A 33kV medium voltage evacuation line transmits the generated energy to a point where it enters the Ugandan electricity grid.

Funding
Kikagati HPP received funding from a number of funding sources including: (a) Netherlands Development Finance Corporation (FMO) (b) Africa Renewable Energy Fund (c) Emerging Africa Infrastructure Fund (EAIF) and (d) Private Infrastructure Development Group (PIDG). All loans are to be repaid within 16 years, from date of commercial commissioning.

See also

Western Uganda
Uganda Power Stations

References

External links
Museveni Commissions Kabalega Power Dam

Hydroelectric power stations in Uganda
Isingiro District
Western Region, Uganda
Buildings and structures in Uganda
Tanzania–Uganda relations
Energy infrastructure completed in 2022
2022 establishments in Uganda